Calcitrapessa is a genus of predatory sea snails, marine gastropod mollusks in the subfamily Ocenebrinae  of the family Muricidae, the murex and rock snails.

Species
 Calcitrapessa leeana (Dall, 1890)

References

 Berry, S.S. (1959). Comments on some of the trivaricate muricines. Leaflets in Malacology. 1(17): 106; 1(18): 113–114.

External links
   Barco, A.; Herbert, G.; Houart, R.; Fassio, G. & Oliverio, M. (2017). A molecular phylogenetic framework for the subfamily Ocenebrinae (Gastropoda, Muricidae). Zoologica Scripta. 46 (3): 322-335

Ocenebrinae